Berberis longipes is a shrub in the family Berberidaceae, first described in 1918. It is native to the States of Durango, Sinaloa, Sonora, and Chihuahua in Mexico.

References

External links
photo of herbarium specimen at Missouri Botanical Garden, isotype of Odostemon longipes 

longipes
Flora of Mexico
Plants described in 1918